This is a list of New Zealand television-related events in 1975.

Events
1 April – Television One commences broadcasting from the new Avalon studio complex.
12 May – Close to Home, New Zealand's second soap opera begins on Television One.
30 June – TV2 is launched.
5 July – Only a week after launching, TV2 stages the country's first Telethon, raising $400,000 for the St John Ambulance service.
 The New Zealand Broadcasting Corporation (NZBC) is divided into Radio New Zealand, Television One, based in Wellington and Dunedin, and TV2, based in Auckland and Christchurch.
 The New Zealand version of the popular children's education series Play School begins on Television One.
 Jennie Goodwin becomes the first female prime time news anchor in a Commonwealth country.

Debuts
12 May – Close to Home (Television One) (1975–1983)
The Games Affair (NZBC) (1975)
Play School (Television One) (1975–1990)

Television shows
Spot On (1973–1988)
Close to Home (1975–1983)
Play School (1975–1990)

Ending this year
The Games Affair (1975)

 
1970s in New Zealand television